Beckenham Road tram stop is a light rail stop in the London Borough of Bromley in the southern suburbs of London. The stop is located on an embankment above Beckenham Road (A234) which connects Beckenham with Crystal Palace and Penge on the site of the short-lived (1858–1860) West End of London & Crystal Palace Railway Penge station.

Services 
Beckenham Road is served by tram services operated by Tramlink.

On Saturday evenings and Sundays, the service is reduced to a tram every 15 minutes in each direction.

Services are operated using Bombardier CR4000 and Stadler Variobahn Trams.

Connections
The stop is served by London Buses routes 194, 227, 354 and 358 which provide connections to Sydenham, Beckenham, Croydon Town Centre, Penge, Crystal Palace, Bromley and Orpington.

Free interchange for journeys made within an hour is available between bus services and between buses and trams is available at Beckenham Road as part of Transport for London's Hopper Fare.

References

External links

Beckenham Road tram Stop – Timetables and live departures at Transport for London

Tramlink stops in the London Borough of Bromley
Railway stations in Great Britain opened in 2000